Sneezeweed is a common name for several plants in the family Asteraceae and may refer to:

Achillea ptarmica, with white flowers
Hymenoxys hoopesii, with long yellow petals, native to western North America
Various species of Helenium, with short yellow petals, native to North and Central America
In Australia, Centipeda cunninghamii or "old man weed" is also referred to as common sneezeweed